Thin Lizzy are an Irish hard rock band from Dublin. Formed in 1969, the group originally consisted of bassist and vocalist Phil Lynott, guitarist Eric Bell, drummer Brian Downey and keyboardist Eric Wrixon. The band broke up in September 1983, at which point the lineup included Lynott and Downey, guitarists Scott Gorham and John Sykes, and keyboardist Darren Wharton. In 1996, ten years after Lynott's death, the group reformed as a touring outfit with new bassist Marco Mendoza, and Sykes taking over lead vocal duties. The most recent lineup included Gorham, Wharton, vocalist Ricky Warwick (since 2010), guitarist Damon Johnson (since 2011), drummer Scott Travis (since 2016) and bassist Troy Sanders (since 2019).

History

1969–1983
Thin Lizzy were formed in December 1969, with four members joining from two bands: guitarist Eric Bell and keyboardist Eric Wrixon from Them, and bassist and vocalist Phil Lynott and drummer Brian Downey from Orphanage. Wrixon performed on the band's debut single "The Farmer", but left before it was released in July 1970. Bell left the band after a concert on New Year's Eve 1973, later citing "ill-health caused by the band's lifestyle" as the reason for his departure. The guitarist was replaced by Gary Moore, although he would only remain with the band for a matter of months. Andy Gee and John Du Cann took over for a tour in May, before Brian Robertson and Scott Gorham were enlisted later in the year as Bell's first full-time replacements.

The lineup of Lynott, Gorham, Robertson and Downey released five studio albums and one live album, all but two of which reached the top ten of the UK Albums Chart, before Robertson left in 1978 and was replaced by the returning Moore. Downey also briefly took a break from Thin Lizzy around the same time, with Mark Nauseef replacing him for a tour in late 1978. Moore left again in July 1979, and was temporarily replaced by Midge Ure. Dave Flett was brought in for a Japanese tour later in the year, as Ure moved over to keyboards, and in early 1980 Snowy White took Flett's place on a more permanent basis. Darren Wharton replaced Ure in April, initially as a touring member. White was replaced by John Sykes in September 1982, who featured on their last studio album Thunder and Lightning. Thin Lizzy broke up in 1983, with their final performance taking place on 4 September on the German Monsters of Rock Tour; Lynott later died of heart failure and pneumonia on 4 January 1986.

1996 onwards
Thin Lizzy reformed in 1996, with Sykes taking over lead vocals and Marco Mendoza joining on bass, alongside returning members Gorham, Wharton and Downey. Tommy Aldridge replaced Downey in 1998, and Wharton left in 2001 to focus on his own band Dare. Mendoza and Aldridge left in 2003 to join Whitesnake, with their places taken by Guy Pratt and Michael Lee, respectively. Pratt was replaced later in the year by Randy Gregg. Mendoza had returned to the band by early 2005, as had Aldridge by early 2007. Mendoza was replaced by Francesco DiCosmo later in 2007. After more touring, Sykes departed Thin Lizzy in mid-2009, with DiCosmo and Aldridge leaving at the same time; speaking about the future of the band, Gorham claimed that "we will be back up to full speed soon".

Gorham reformed Thin Lizzy in 2010 with former members Mendoza, Downey and Wharton, in addition to new guitarist Vivian Campbell and lead vocalist Ricky Warwick. Campbell was replaced by Richard Fortus after returning to Def Leppard in mid-2011, before Damon Johnson became his permanent replacement later in the year. The band was put on hiatus in December 2012, when all members formed Black Star Riders, before returning in 2016 with Mikkey Dee initially announced on drums. Without performing with the band, Dee was replaced three months later by Judas Priest's Scott Travis, as Aerosmith's Tom Hamilton also replaced Mendoza. In April 2019, Mastodon's Troy Sanders took over from Hamilton on bass.

Original tenure (1969–1983)

Official members

Touring members

Recent years (1996 onwards)

Current members

Former members

Timeline

Lineups

Bibliography

References

External links
Thin Lizzy official website

Thin Lizzy